Josh Saunders (born 1981) is an American soccer player

Josh or Joshua Saunders may also refer to:
 
 Josh Saunders (Australian footballer) (born 1994), Australian rules footballer for St Kilda
 Josh Saunders (EastEnders), a fictional character on EastEnders
 Takion, real name Joshua Saunders
 Joshua Saunders, High Sheriff of Bristol, 1860
 Joshua Saunders (Hollyoaks)